Waimanu Valley is a remote valley on the northeast coast of Hawaii island. Besides the main Waimanu Stream, it includes Waihīlau Falls on a tributary.

Description
Wai manu literally means "bird water" or "river of birds" in the Hawaiian language.
During the time of Ancient Hawaii it was an ahupuaa, or ancient land division with a small village. Most of the area is state forest land, with a few campsites available with reservations. It is located in the Hāmākua district of Hawaii island.
The Waimanu Stream watershed includes many smaller flows from Kohala Mountain to the Pacific Ocean at sea level.
A system of dikes of hard lava rock force large amounts of ground water dropped from the tradewinds into this valley, making it very different from the smaller shallow valleys directly to the west. This ridge is administered as the Puu O Umi Natural State Area Reserve.

Waihīlau Falls is one of the tallest single drops of a waterfall in the United States. The name comes from wai hī lau which means "many trickling waters" since during heavy rains the stream splits into many smaller streams overflowing the cliff.
Other streams with waterfalls in the valley include Waiilikahi Falls and Lahomene Falls.

The valley is not accessible by automobile. A foot trail called Waimanu or Muliwai Trail leads down a steep path from the Waipio Valley. At the south end of the valley, Waimanu Gap at  elevation leads to the upper end of Waipio Valley.

References

External links
 

Canyons and gorges of Hawaii
Valleys of Hawaii
Landforms of Hawaii (island)
Beaches of Hawaii (island)